Château de Malleret is a château in Gironde, Aquitaine, France. 

Châteaux in Gironde